The Hailu dialect (Hailu Hakka Romanization System: hoi´ liug` kiong`), also known as the Hoiluk dialect or Hailu Hakka, is a dialect of Hakka Chinese that originated in Shanwei, Guangdong. It is also the second most common dialect of Hakka spoken in Taiwan.

Classification
The first edition of the Language Atlas of China places the Hakka dialects spoken in Haifeng and Lufeng into the Xin–Hui cluster of the Yue–Tai subgroup of Hakka. In the second edition, it is given its own subgroup known as the Hai–Lu subgroup separate from the Yue–Tai subgroup.

Chang Song-hing and Zhuang Chusheng propose that it should be grouped as the Hai–Lu cluster of the Mei–Shao subgroup.

Distribution
In China, the Hailu dialect is spoken in Shanwei, Guangdong, particularly in Haifeng, Lufeng, and Luhe. As of 2012, there are around 1.18 million speakers of the dialect in these three areas.

In Taiwan, it is spoken in Hsinchu County (Xinfeng, Xinpu, Hukou, Qionglin, Hengshan, Guanxi, Beipu, Baoshan, Emei, and Zhudong), Hsinchu City (Xiangshan and Xinfeng), Taoyuan (mostly in Guanyin, Xinwu, and Yangmei; also pockets in Pingzhen, Zhongli, and Longtan), Hualien County (Ji'an, Shoufeng, Guangfu, Yuli, Ruisui, and Fenglin), and Miaoli County (Toufen, Sanwan, Nanzhuang, Xihu, Houlong, Zaoqiao, Tongxiao, and Tongluo). In 2013, 41.5% of Hakka people in Taiwan were reported to be able to communicate in the Hailu dialect.

In Indonesia, it is widely spoken in northern West Kalimantan, including Singkawang, Sambas, and Pemangkat.

Phonology

Tones
The Hailu dialect has seven lexical tones:

Notes

References
 
 
 
 
 
 
 
 
 

Hakka Chinese
Shanwei